Christoph Schmid (born 5 August 1982 in Zug) is a Swiss sport shooter. He won a silver medal in the men's 50 m free pistol at the 2007 ISSF World Cup series in Fort Benning, Georgia, accumulating a score of 659.7 points.

Career 
Schmid represented Switzerland at the 2008 Summer Olympics in Beijing, where he competed in two pistol shooting events. He scored a total of 573 targets in the preliminary rounds of the men's 10 m air pistol, by two points behind Australia's Daniel Repacholi from the final attempt, finishing only in thirty-third place. Three days later, Schmid placed fortieth in his second event, 50 m pistol, by one point behind Poland's Wojciech Knapik, with a total score of 542 targets.

References

External links
 
 
 
 

1982 births
Living people
Swiss male sport shooters
Olympic shooters of Switzerland
Shooters at the 2008 Summer Olympics
People from Zug
Sportspeople from the canton of Zug